Mr. Soft Touch is a 1949 American film noir crime film directed by Gordon Douglas and Henry Levin and starring Glenn Ford and Evelyn Keyes. The film is also known as House of Settlement.

Plot
Polish American Joe Miracle (Mirakowski) returns from fighting in World War II, only to find his San Francisco nightclub under the control of the mob, and his friend and partner Leo missing and presumed murdered. To get even, he robs $100,000 from his former business, planning to leave the country as soon as possible. He goes to the apartment of Victor Christopher, Leo's brother, where he picks up a ticket Victor and his wife Clara had purchased for him. However, he discovers to his dismay that they could only book him on a ship that sails for Yokohama on Christmas Eve, the next night. He has to hide until then. When the police come to stop Victor from ringing a bell and disturbing the neighbors, Joe pretends to be him in order to spend the night safely in jail. However, Jenny Jones, a kindhearted social worker, gets him remanded into her custody instead.

She takes him to the Borden Street Settlement House, where the down and out are helped, among them a talkative, opinionated carpenter named Rickle. As they get better acquainted, Jenny and Joe begin falling in love, though she turns down his advances, as she believes he is a wife beater. Joe causes trouble. He turns the tables on some youths who try to cheat him at craps and also accidentally falls on an old piano, breaking it. Feeling responsible, he goes to a nearby piano store (actually a front for a gambling parlor) and, pretending to be newly assigned to the police precinct, cons the owner into donating a piano in return for Joe turning a blind eye to the illicit activities there. However, he is recognized by newspaper columnist Henry "Early" Byrd.

Byrd tries to find out from Jenny if Joe is staying at the settlement house, but she refuses to divulge anything. From Byrd's description, Jenny realizes that Joe is not Victor. When she finds out Joe also has a pistol, she insists he leave. During their argument, he describes his lifelong drive to get out of the "gutter" where he was born, and accuses her of not knowing the underside of life; she shames him by telling of how a drunken blow from her father  
in her childhood rendered her deaf without the hearing aid he then scrimped and saved to buy her.

Byrd returns and tries to get Joe to tell him the name of the man providing protection to the crooks, but Joe refuses to talk. When he collects his money, Jenny pleads with him to give it back so they can start a life together. He counters by asking her to leave the country with him. Neither accepts the other's proposal. Meanwhile, the mobsters force Clara to tell them where Joe is hiding and start a fire to smoke him out. They recover the money, but the settlement house is left in smoldering ruins. Joe tries to justify himself to Jenny, but she pulls out her hearing aid to show him she won't listen.

Joe enters the nightclub through a secret passageway and takes the money again from the new boss, Barney Teener. He hires some men to dress up as Santa Claus to distribute presents to the children at a fundraiser at the settlement house. Joe slips in as another Santa and leaves the money to pay for the rebuilding. As he slips away, Jenny realizes what is going on and chases him out into the street, calling his name. Hearing this, the waiting mobsters shoot Joe in the back. He falls and is literally lying in the gutter, and he begs Jenny to take him out of it. She lifts him into her arms and says he isn't in the gutter any more. The film ends at this point, leaving it unclear whether he will live or die.

Cast
 Glenn Ford as Joe Miracle
 Evelyn Keyes as Jenny Jones
 John Ireland as Henry "Early" Byrd
 Beulah Bondi as Clara Hangale
 Percy Kilbride as Rickle
 Clara Blandick as Susan Balmuss
 Ted de Corsia as Rainey
 Stanley Clements as Yonzi
 Roman Bohnen as Barney Teener
 Lora Lee Michel as Sonya
 Harry Shannon as Police Sergeant Garrett
 Charles Trowbridge as	Judge Fuller (uncredited)

Note: This was Bohnen's final film. He succumbed to a heart attack five months before the film's release. It was also the last of six films in which Ford and Keyes co-starred.

Shown on the Turner Classic Movies show 'Noir Alley' with Eddie Muller on December 17, 2022.

See also
 List of Christmas films

References

External links
 
 
 
 
 

1949 films
1949 crime drama films
American black-and-white films
Columbia Pictures films
Film noir
Films directed by Gordon Douglas
Films directed by Henry Levin
Films set in San Francisco
Films scored by Heinz Roemheld
Films about organized crime in the United States
1940s Christmas drama films
American crime drama films
1940s American films
American Christmas drama films
1940s English-language films